This article covers the best practices and needs for reform in entrepreneurship policies in Syria.

Startup, ease of entry

For-profit companies

Syria has had several business start-up reforms over the past decade, and still ranked relatively low in the 2010 Doing Business report, moving down from 133rd to 134th in the ease of starting a business. Business start-up required 7 procedures, took 17 days, and cost nearly 28% of GNI per capita to start a business in 2009, and had the highest minimum paid-in capital in the world at 1,013% of income per capita. This was nine times the regional average. Syria further reduced the capital requirement to 355.1% of income per capita in 2010.

Best practices
In 2006, Syria reduced its registration tax (stamp duty) from 1.5% to 0.5% of capital.  In 2007 it enforced publication of the memorandum of association in the official gazette for new companies, making registration more expensive, but this was abolished in 2008, when the new company was instead required to publish a copy of registration certificate. Syria introduced a new commercial code in 2007 that simplified business start-up and made registration administrative rather than judicial by abolishing the court and lawyers’ participation in the registration process, introduced statutory limits and simplified tax registrations for new business.   In 2009, it put registration forms online, however it doubled the cost of registration due to higher publication and incorporation fees from 18.2% to 27.80% GNI per capita. Furthermore, in 2010 it decentralized approval of the company memorandum, reducing four days to register, but increasing the cost to 38.1%(GNI income per capita). 
In 2008, Syria had an increase of 33% in its minimum paid-in capital requirement, equivalent to 4,354% of income per capita, making it more difficult for entrepreneurs. This was reversed in 2009 to about 10 times the average income per capita—still the highest paid-in minimum capital requirement in the world ($70,660). Syria continued to improve, in 2010, it eased business start-up by reducing the minimum capital requirement for limited liability companies by two-thirds.
The entry of private banks into the Syrian market sped up the issuing of Letters of Credit reducing two days in time for both exports and imports. Reforms in customs started in 2005 with the intention of implementing electronic data interchange system, to simplify procedures, increase transparency and improve the productivity. By 2006, new IT equipment and software were set up in four locations allowing traders to submit declarations online.

Needed reforms

Syria does not have a fully fledged enterprise policy framework and lacks clarity in institutional implementation.

Finances
Access to finance remains one of the key problems for enterprises operating in Syria particularly for small and medium enterprises (SME's). In spite of the reforms initiated by the government and the Central Bank of Syria, the legal and regulatory environment remained relatively underdeveloped and the ranges of banking and financial services for the enterprise sector were limited. Syria ranked 181st out of 183 economies worldwide in the ease of getting credit, putting the country in the bottom three. As of 2009, credit information services and credit guarantee schemes or credit bureau registry that could supported access to credit by reducing collateral requirements were not available in Syria. Few microfinance facilities exist and most of these operate as pilot projects. Although the Commercial Bank of Syria (its largest state-owned bank) was officially charged in February 2009 with increasing loans for small business startups, a climate of corruption may deter many would-be entrepreneurs. 
Syria enhanced access to credit by eliminating the minimum threshold for loans included in the database, which expanded the coverage of individuals and firms to 2.8% of the adult population.

Private equity
Syria has no legislation related to investment funds. There are no equity funds operating in the country as of 2009. The government has recently licensed a number of holding companies, in order to mobilize equity funds from private entrepreneurs.

Capital markets
The Damascus Stock Exchange (DSE) was inaugurated on 10 March 2009, based on plans for a stock market in Damascus stemming back to 2006. Its opening was delayed several times by claims of insufficient technology and a lack of human resources necessary for operating the exchange.  DSE started trading with five companies, with number of restrictions such as a limit of 2 percent on daily volatility in the price of stocks and a ban on the sell and a purchase of a stock in the same day.

Informal investment
The rate of informal investment in Syria outperformed the rest of the region at 5% of GDP compared to Saudi Arabia -0.8%.  As per the latest survey conducted by Global Entrepreneurship Monitor (GEM) in 2009, entrepreneurs have expected business start-up financing from informal investors varying from immediate family members (49.1%), other relatives (12.7%), colleague (41.8%) and friends/neighbors (21.8%).

Needed reforms
Government action in this area should tackle both the upgrading of the regulatory and legislative framework, and the opening and restructuring of the banking sector. A good starting point would be the establishment of a credit guarantee scheme built as a partnership between the public and the private sector, taking as reference, for instance, the experience of Jordan.

Contracts/Commercial Law
Enforcement of contracts in Syria requires 55 procedures, takes 872 days and costs 29.3% of claim to execute. The country ranked relatively low in this category at 176th according to the latest doing business report, placing the country in the bottom ten worldwide.

Bankruptcy
A summary of Doing Business report 2010 in the ease of closing business ranked Syria in 87th place.  It evaluated the effectiveness of the insolvency regime in Syria along three dimensions: the average time (in years) to complete a bankruptcy proceeding, the average cost of such proceedings (as a percentage of the estate), and the recovery rate to creditors (expressed in cents on the dollar). For Syria, the time averages 4.1 years, and the cost is, on average, 9% of the estate. Creditors claim, on average, 29.3 cents on the dollar.

Taxes
In Syria, taxes and fees exceed 20% of the property value. It started on 2004 when Tax forms were unified, In 2006, paying taxes made easier by reducing the rate to encourage foreign and domestic investments and increase tax collection.  In the same year, the Tax Evasion Law and other laws that carried stricter enforcement measures, including imprisonment was implemented. It was further simplified in 2007. Syria ranked 105th in the ease of paying taxes worldwide.

Labor market
In 2007-8 the United Nations Human Development Index (HDI) placed Syria 108 out of 177 countries, in its list of countries with medium human development, and 12 out of 20 Arab countries in the Arab Human Development Report ranking.

Youth represent nearly 80 percent of the unemployed in Syria, the highest share among non-Gulf countries. Thus, unemployment in Syria is essentially a youth issue. The government is trying to reduce reliance on public sector jobs and to loosen regulatory controls on the private sector. Alissa

Education
The education system in Syria is divided into three main levels: school, college, and university. Schooling is divided into six years of compulsory primary, three years of lower secondary (preparatory), and three years of upper secondary education. In recent years, a new system has seen the primary and preparatory levels combined into ‘basic education’. Lower and upper secondary schools provide general (which prepares for university entrance) or vocational curricula. Colleges are open to all students who wish to continue their education. Obtaining a college degree requires two years of college education, after completing the secondary education. University students have to attend a minimum of four years of education before obtaining a university degree. In addition, postgraduate education is also available in Syria.

EPE and Training
The government under Ministry of Education/Directorate of Technical and Vocational Education, in coordination with businesses and industry associations, is taking the lead in the implementation of EPE teaching and learning experiences within the education and training system of Syria. Several programmes are being undertaken like “Starting My Own Small Business” modules (UNESCO), the “SHABAB programme 2006-2007” supported fostering entrepreneurial culture, and the ILO package “Know About Business”  (KAB) introduced entrepreneurship to secondary and vocational institutes with the aim of creating awareness of enterprises and self-employment as a career option for young people; and develop positive attitudes towards enterprises and self-employment among the population.

Ranking for the Arab Countries

Notes:
n/a - not ranked
Ease of Doing Business - ranked among 189 Economies
GCI Index - ranked among 139 Economies
Economic Freedom Score - 0 to 100, where 100 represents the maximum freedom
Prosperity Index -The Prosperity Index assessed 110 countries, accounting for over 90 percent of the world’s population, and is based on 89 different variables, each of which has a demonstrated effect on economic growth or on personal wellbeing. The Index consists of eight sub-indexes, i.e. Economy, Entrepreneurship & Opportunity (E&O), Governance, Education, Health, Safety & Security, Personal Freedom and Social Capital.
The ICT value falls on a scale of 0-10 and is calculated from three key indicators: number of telephone lines per thousand of the population, number of computers per thousand of the population, and number of internet users per thousand of the population. The top 10 per cent of states score in the range 9-10, the next highest 10 per cent of states score in the range 8-9 and so on.
Innovation System Index - The index value falls on a scale of 0-10 and is calculated from three key indicators: Total royalty payments and receipts in US$ per person, number of patent applications granted by the US Patent and Trademark Office per million people, and the number of scientific and technical journal articles published per million people. The top 10 percent of states score in the range 9-10, the next highest 10 per cent of states score in the range 8-9 and so on.
HDI - Calculated based on data from UNDESA (2009d), Barro and Lee (2010), UNESCO Institute for Statistics (2010a), World Bank (2010g) and IMF (2010a).
Education and Human Resources Score - The index value falls on a scale of 0-10 and is calculated from three key indicators: adult literacy rate, secondary enrolment, and tertiary enrolment. The top 10 per cent of states score in the range 9-10, the next highest 10 per cent of states score in the range 8-9 and so on.
Press Freedom Index- The lower the value of a state’s press freedom index, the better the situation for press freedom, ranked among 178 countries.

Notes

Economy of Syria